From the Heart - the Greatest Hits is the first greatest hits album by the British boy band Another Level, released on 1 June 2002, two years after the group had split. The album was released to fulfill the band's three-album deal which they signed when they were signed to Northwestside Records in 1998. The album contains all eight of the band's singles including their cover of "Holding Back the Years" (which was a double A-side with "Be Alone No More '99"), three popular album tracks, plus five additional alternative versions including a previously unreleased live session of "I Can See You in My Mind".

Track listing

References

Another Level (band) albums
2002 compilation albums